This article lists events relating to rail transport that occurred during the 1720s.

1722

Events

Unknown date events
 Opening of the Tranent to Cockenzie Waggonway, the first wagonway in Scotland, from the coal pits at Tranent to Cockenzie harbour in East Lothian.

1729

Events

Unknown date events
 First known use of cast iron wheels on a wagonway, in the Coalbrookdale district of Shropshire, England.

See also
Years in rail transport

References